Suleiman Ahmed Gulaid is a Somali educator and the president of Amoud University.
Suleiman Ahmed Gulaid spent a lifetime as an educator. His work at Amoud University is the most consequential project in post-civil war Somali education. Under his leadership, Amoud University has become a flagship institution. Amoud University had six students in 2000 and now has close to 4,000 students from all Somali regions, and even from the Diaspora. It is now the first Somali university to add graduate studies to its degree programs.

References 

1942 births
Living people
Somalian academic administrators
Somalian educators
People from Awdal
Gadabuursi